Giuseppe Domenico Scarlatti, also known as Domingo or Doménico Scarlatti (26 October 1685 – 23 July 1757), was an Italian composer. He is classified primarily as a Baroque composer chronologically, although his music was influential in the development of the Classical style. Like his renowned father Alessandro Scarlatti, he composed in a variety of musical forms, although today he is known mainly for his 555 keyboard sonatas. He spent much of his life in the service of the Portuguese and Spanish royal families.

Life and career 
Scarlatti was born in Naples, Kingdom of Naples, belonging to the Spanish Crown. He was born in 1685, the same year as Johann Sebastian Bach and George Frideric Handel. He was the sixth of ten children of the composer and teacher Alessandro Scarlatti. His older brother Pietro Filippo was also a musician.

Scarlatti first studied music under his father. Other composers who may have been his early teachers include Gaetano Greco, Francesco Gasparini, and Bernardo Pasquini, all of whom may have influenced his musical style. Muzio Clementi brought Scarlatti's sonatas into the classical style by editing what is known to be their first publication.

Scarlatti was appointed as a composer and organist at the Chapel Royal of Naples in 1701 and briefly worked under his father, who was then the chapel's maestro di cappella. In 1703 he revised Carlo Francesco Pollarolo's opera Irene for performance at Naples. Soon after, his father sent him to Venice. After this, nothing is known of his life until 1709, when he went to Rome and entered the service of the exiled Polish queen Marie Casimir. It was there he met Thomas Roseingrave. Scarlatti was already an accomplished harpsichordist; there is a story of a trial of skill with George Frideric Handel at the palace of Cardinal Ottoboni in Rome, where Scarlatti was judged possibly superior to Handel on the harpsichord, although inferior on the organ. Later in life, he was known to cross himself in veneration when speaking of Handel's skill.

While in Rome, Scarlatti composed several operas for Queen Casimir's private theatre. He was Maestro di Cappella at St. Peter's from 1715 to 1719. In 1719 he travelled to London to direct his opera Narciso at the King's Theatre.

According to Vicente Bicchi, Papal Nuncio in Portugal at the time, Scarlatti arrived in Lisbon on 29 November 1719. There he taught music to the Portuguese princess Maria Magdalena Barbara. He left Lisbon on 28 January 1727 for Rome, where he married Maria Caterina Gentili on 6 May 1728. In 1729 he moved to Seville, staying for four years. In 1733, he went to Madrid as a music master to Princess Maria Barbara, who had married into the Spanish royal house. She later became Queen of Spain. Scarlatti remained in Spain for the remaining 25 years of his life and had five children there. After his wife died in 1739, he married a Spaniard, Anastasia Maxarti Ximenes. Among his compositions during his time in Madrid were most of the 555 keyboard sonatas for which he is best known.

Scarlatti befriended the castrato singer Farinelli, a fellow Neapolitan also enjoying royal patronage in Madrid. Musicologist and harpsichordist Ralph Kirkpatrick commented that Farinelli's correspondence provides "most of the direct information about Scarlatti that has transmitted itself to our day".

Scarlatti died in Madrid at the age of 71. His residence at 35 Calle de Leganitos is designated with a historical plaque, and his descendants still live in Madrid. He was buried at a convent there, but his grave no longer exists.

Minor planet 6480 Scarlatti is named in his honour.

Music

Only a small number of Scarlatti's compositions were published during his lifetime. Scarlatti himself seems to have overseen the publication in 1738 of the most famous collection, his 30 Essercizi (Exercises). They were well received throughout Europe and were championed by the foremost English writer on music of the eighteenth century, Charles Burney.

The many sonatas unpublished during Scarlatti's lifetime have appeared in print irregularly in the past two and a half centuries. He has attracted notable admirers, including Béla Bartók, Arturo Benedetti Michelangeli, Pieter-Jan Belder, Johann Sebastian Bach, Muzio Clementi, Wolfgang Amadeus Mozart, Ludwig van Beethoven, Carl Czerny, Franz Liszt, Johannes Brahms, Frédéric Chopin, Claude Debussy, Emil Gilels, Francis Poulenc, Olivier Messiaen, Enrique Granados, Marc-André Hamelin, Vladimir Horowitz, Ivo Pogorelić, Scott Ross (the first performer to record all 555 sonatas), Heinrich Schenker, András Schiff and Dmitri Shostakovich. 

Scarlatti's 555 keyboard sonatas are single movements, mostly in binary form, and some in early sonata form, and mostly written for harpsichord or the earliest pianofortes. (There are four for the organ, and a few for the small instrumental groups). Some display harmonic audacity in their use of discords, and unconventional modulations to remote keys.

Other distinctive attributes of his music are:
The influence of Iberian (Portuguese and Spanish) folk music. An example is his use of the Phrygian mode and other tonal inflections more or less alien to European art music. Many of his figurations and dissonances are suggestive of the guitar.
The influence of the Spanish guitar can be seen in notes being played repeatedly.
A formal device where each half of a sonata leads to a pivotal point, which Kirkpatrick termed "the crux", and which is sometimes underlined by a pause or fermata. Before the crux, Scarlatti sonatas often contain their main thematic variety, and after the crux, the music makes more use of repetitive figurations as it modulates away from the home key (in the first half) or back to the home key (in the second half).
Its tendency to be in the galant style.

Kirkpatrick produced an edition of the sonatas in 1953, and the numbering from this edition—the Kk. or K. number—is now nearly always used. Previously, the numbering commonly used was from the 1906 edition compiled by Neapolitan pianist Alessandro Longo (L. numbers). Kirkpatrick's numbering is chronological, while Longo's ordering is a result of his arbitrarily grouping the sonatas into "suites". In 1967 the Italian musicologist Giorgio Pestelli published a revised catalog (using P. numbers), which corrected what he considered to be some anachronisms, and added some sonatas missing from Kirkpatrick's edition. Although the exact composition dates for these surviving sonatas are not known, Kirkpatrick concluded that they might all have been composed late in Scarlatti's career (after 1735), with most of them possibly written after the composer's 67th birthday.

Aside from his many sonatas, Scarlatti composed several operas, cantatas, and liturgical pieces. Well-known works include the Stabat Mater of 1715, and the Salve Regina of 1756, which is thought to be his last composition.

Selected discography

Complete works 
 L'Œuvre pour clavier, Scott Ross (1988, 34 CDs Erato/Radio France) 
 Domenico Scarlatti: The Complete Sonatas, Richard Lester, harpsichord & fortepiano (2001–2005, 39 CDs in 7 volumes Nimbus Records NI 1725/NI 1741) .
 Keyboard Sonatas, Emilia Fadini, Ottavio Dantone, Sergio Vartolo, Marco Farolfi, Enrico Baiano..., harpsichord, fortepiano, organ (1999–2012, 12 CDs Stradivarius) – in progress
 Keyboard Sonatas, Pieter-Jan Belder, harpsichord & fortepiano (2012, 36 CDs Brilliant Classics)
 Keyboard Sonatas, Carlo Grante, Bösendorfer Imperial piano (2009–2020, 35 CDs in 6 volumes Music & Arts)

Piano recitals 

 2 Sonatas: Sonata K. 9 and Sonata K. 380 – Dinu Lipatti, piano (20 February and 27 September 1947, EMI / 12 CDs Hänssler PH17011)
 4 Sonatas : Sonata K. 1, Sonata K. 87, Sonata K. 193, and Sonata K. 386 – Clara Haskil, piano (? 1947, BBC / « Inédits Haskil » Tahra TAH 389 / TAH 4025)
 11 Sonatas: Sonata K. 1, Sonate K. 35, Sonata K. 87, Sonata K. 132, Sonata K. 193, Sonata K. 247, Sonata K. 322, Sonata K. 386, Sonata K. 437, Sonata K. 515, Sonata K. 519 – Clara Haskil, piano (October 1951, Westminster/DG 471 214-2)
 3 Sonatas: Sonata K. 87, Sonata K. 193, and Sonata K. 386 – Clara Haskil, piano (October 1951, Philips)
 The Siena Pianoforte: 6 Scarlatti sonatas (and 3 sonatas of Mozart) – Charles Rosen, Siena piano (1955, Counterpoint/Esoteric / Everest Records CPT 53000)
 37 Piano Sonatas : Vladimir Horowitz (1946–1981, Complete Recordings RCA and CBS/Sony Classical)
 33 Sonatas : Christian Zacharias, piano (1979, 1981, 1984, EMI)
 18 sonatas : Maria Tipo, piano (27–28 November 1987, EMI CDC 7 49078 2) 
 15 sonatas : Ivo Pogorelich, piano (September 1991, DG) 
 Scarlatti: Keyboard Sonatas : Mikhail Pletnev, piano (October 1994, Virgin Classics 5181862) 
 16 Sonatas : Christian Zacharias, piano (1995, EMI)
 20 Sonatas : Valerie Tryon, piano (18 and 28 September 1999, Appian Publications & Recordings [APR]) 
 14 Sonatas: Christian Zacharias, piano (June 2002, MDG 34011622)
 18 Sonatas : Racha Arodaky, piano (17–21 July 2005, Zig-Zag Territoires) 
 Scarlatti: Piano Sonatas : Yevgeny Sudbin, piano (2005, BIS)
 Alexandre Tharaud joue Scarlatti : 18 sonatas (30 August/3 September 2010, Virgin Classics) 
 Scarlatti: 18 Sonatas: Yevgeny Sudbin, piano (2016, BIS) 
 Scarlatti: 52 Sonatas: Lucas Debargue, piano (2019, Sony Music)

Fortepiano recitals 

 Sonate per cembalo, 1742, Francesco Cera, harpsichord & fortepiano (7–9 March 2000, March 2001, October 2002, 3 CD Tactus) 
 Sonates – Una nuova inventione per Maria Barbara, Aline Zylberajch, fortepiano after Cristofori (2005, Ambronay)

Harpsichord recitals 

 Sonatas for Harpsichord, Wanda Landowska (1934, 1939, 1940, EMI)
 Keyboard Sonatas, Fernando Valenti (the 1950s, Westminster / 3 CDs Millenium MCA Universal, rereleased. 1998) 
 Keyboard Sonatas, Fernando Valenti (1951–1955, 11 CDs Pristine Audio, rereleased. 2006) 
 60 Harpsichord Sonatas, Ralph Kirkpatrick (1954, CBS SL 221 / 2 CD Urania, rerelease of 54 sonatas in 2004)
 Harpsichord Sonatas, Luciano Sgrizzi, harpsichord (1964, Accord)
 21 Harpsichord Sonatas, Ralph Kirkpatrick (1966, 1971, Archiv Produktion, rereleased 2004)
 10 Sonatas, Gustav Leonhardt (1970, Deutsche Harmonia Mundi)
 16 Harpsichord Sonatas, Joseph Payne (1971, Turnabout)
 Sonates pour clavecin, Blandine Verlet (1975, Philips)
 Sonates pour clavecin, Blandine Verlet (1976, Philips)
 14 Harpsichord Sonatas, Gustav Leonhardt (1979, Seon/Sony)
 Harpsichord Sonatas – Colin Tilney, Vincenzio harpsichord 1782 (August 1979, L'Oiseau-Lyre/Decca)
 Harpsichord Sonatas, Trevor Pinnock (1981, CRD Records; rereleased in 1995) 
 Sonatas, Trevor Pinnock (1987, Archiv)
 12 Sonatas, Colin Tilney (1988, Dorian)
 Les plus belles sonatas, Scott Ross (1988, Erato/Radio France)
 Trente Sonates, Rafael Puyana (1988, 2CD Harmonia Mundi)
 16 Sonatas, Ton Koopman (1988, Capriccio)
 Sonatas, Andreas Staier (December 1990, 26–28 October 1991, 2 CDs Deutsche Harmonia Mundi) 
 Sonatas, Bob van Asperen (May 1991, « Reflexe » EMI) 
 22 sonates, Pierre Hantaï (June 1992, Astrée E 8502)
 Cat Fugue and Sonatas for Harpsichord, Elaine Comparone (27–28 August 1992, Lyrichord) 
 Sonatas, Andreas Staier (December 1995, Teldec) 
 Sonates inédites, Fandango, Mayako Soné (1994, Erato/Warner Classics)
 Scarlatti High and Low – 16 dernières sonates pour clavecin, Colin Tilney (1995, Music & Arts)
 18 Sonatas, Eiji Hashimoto, harpsichord (1996, Klavier) 
 15 sonates pour clavecin, Christophe Rousset (1998, Decca)
 Sonates, Pierre Hantaï (2002, 2004, 2005, 2016, 2017, 2019 6 CDs/SACD Mirare)
 Sonatas, Elaine Thornburgh (2005, 2 CDs Lyrichord) 
 Duende (17 sonatas), Skip Sempé (with Olivier Fortin, second harpsichord) (2006, Paradizo)
 16 Sonates – Jean Rondeau (2018, SACD Erato)
 Zones, Lillian Gordis (June 2019, Paraty PTY 919180)

Vocal music 
 Scarlatti: Stabat Mater – Campra: Requiem. Monteverdi Choir; John Eliot Gardiner, conductor (2020, Erato)

References

Further reading

 Domenico Scarlatti. Sixty Sonatas in Two volumes, edited in chronological order from the manuscripts and earliest printed sources with a preface by Ralph Kirkpatrick, New York, G. Schirmer, 1953.
 D. Scarlatti. Sonates, in 11 volumes, ed. Kenneth Gilbert after the Venice manuscripts, Paris, Heugel, coll. « Le Pupitre », from 1975 to 1984.
 Domenico Scarlatti. Complete Keyboard Works, in facsimile from the manuscript (Parma) and printed sources, rev. Ralph Kirkpatrick, New York, Johnson Reprint Corporation, 1971.
 Scarlatti, Domenico. Sonate per cembalo del Cavalier Dn. Domenico Scarlatti. Complete facsimile of the Venice manuscripts in 15 volumes. Archivum Musicum: Monumenta Musicae Revocata, 1/I–XV. Florence, 1985–1992.

External links

 
 
 
 Associazione Domenico Scarlatti
 John Sankey: Keyboard Tuning of Domenico Scarlatti
Scarlatti Domenico – complete catalogue of 600 keyboard sonatas including newly discovered works and the latest biographical discoveries
 "The mercurial maestro of Madrid" by Robert White, 20 July 2007, The Guardian
 La Guitarra y Domenico Scarlatti
 Piano Society  – A short biography and some free recordings in MP3 format, performed by Roberto Carnevale, Chase Coleman, Graziella Concas, and Knut Erik Jensen
 Piano sonatas of Domenico Scarlatti for listening and downloading (Czech Radio Project)

1685 births
1757 deaths
18th-century Italian composers
Italian classical composers
Italian pianists
18th-century Italian male musicians
18th-century keyboardists
18th-century Neapolitan people
Catholic liturgical composers
Composers for harpsichord
Italian Baroque composers
Italian male classical composers
Italian harpsichordists
Italian expatriates in Portugal
Italian expatriates in Spain
Italian opera composers
Male opera composers
Musicians from Naples
Musicians from Madrid
Neapolitan school composers
People of Sicilian descent